Live in Chicago 12.19.98 at the United Center, also known as simply Live in Chicago 12.19.98, is a live album by the Dave Matthews Band, released by RCA on October 23, 2001.  It was recorded at the United Center in Chicago, Illinois.  It was originally broadcast as a live webcast, with the recording released on CD.

Track listing
All songs by David J. Matthews unless noted.
Disc one
"Intro" – 0:45
 "The Last Stop" – 11:04
 "Don't Drink the Water" – 6:57
 "#41" – 10:20
with Victor Wooten
 "#40" » – 0:37
solo by Dave Matthews
 "Lie in Our Graves" – 12:38
 "What Would You Say" – 5:35
with Maceo Parker
 "Pantala Intro" » – 5:05
 "Pantala Naga Pampa" » – 0:40
 "Rapunzel" – 7:21
 "Stay (Wasting Time)" – 6:53

Disc two
"The Maker" (Daniel Lanois) – 9:37
with Mitch Rutman and Victor Wooten
 "Crash into Me" – 5:56
 "Jimi Thing" – 14:10
 "So Much to Say" (Matthews, Peter Griesar) » "Anyone Seen the Bridge?" » – 5:41
 "Too Much" – 5:13
 "Christmas Song" – 5:52
 "Watchtower Intro" » – 2:25
solo by Stefan Lessard
 "All Along the Watchtower" (Bob Dylan) – 12:01

Personnel
Dave Matthews Band
Carter Beauford – percussion, drums
Stefan Lessard – bass guitar
Dave Matthews – guitar, vocals
LeRoi Moore – saxophone, horns
Boyd Tinsley – violin

Additional musicians
Maceo Parker – saxophone on "What Would You Say"
Tim Reynolds – electric guitar
Mitch Rutman – electric guitar on "The Maker"
Victor Wooten – bass guitar on "#41" and "The Maker"

References

Albums produced by John Alagía
Dave Matthews Band live albums
2001 live albums
RCA Records live albums